The 1820 New York gubernatorial election was held in April 1820 to elect the Governor and Lieutenant Governor of New York. Governor Clinton was the incumbent. U.S. Vice President Tompkins had been governor from 1807 to 1817. Tompkins would be re-elected vice president, in November 1820.

Candidates
The Clintonian faction of the Democratic-Republican Party nominated incumbent DeWitt Clinton. For Lieutenant Governor they nominated incumbent John Tayler.

The anti-Clintonian faction of the Democratic-Republican Party nominated Vice President Daniel D. Tompkins.

Results
The Clintonian ticket of Clinton and Tayler was elected.

Sources
Result: The Tribune Almanac 1841

See also
New York gubernatorial elections
New York state elections

1820
New York
Gubernatorial election
1820 in New York (state)
April 1820 events